Let's Turkey Trot is a popular song with writing credits to Gerry Goffin and Jack Keller and/or Carole King.  It was released by Little Eva as her third single for the Dimension label. The Little Eva's recording debuted on the charts on February 2, 1963, and peaked at #20 on the Hot 100. It was her third top 40 record. 

The record features girl group The Cookies on background vocals, with the Cookies' lead Earl-Jean McCrea getting some solo lines. The song's title is a reference to the turkey trot dance step, a step that was only briefly popular fifty years before the song was released; the song is played at a tempo much slower than the one used for the dance in its heyday. The B-side of the original single is a Goffin-King song called "Down Home" that is also found on the 1962 Llllloco-Motion LP.

Little Eva's "Let's Turkey Trot" was used in the film Easy Rider, but it was omitted from the soundtrack album.

Cash Box said that it "should start the kids off on another dance craze-as the tag implies" and it was a "sparkling choral and instrumental showcase on a lid that can go all the way."

The song was covered by Jan & Dean on their 1963 album, Jan & Dean take Linda Surfin.

The Dollyrots covered the song on their EP "A Dollyrots Christmas".

References

1963 songs
Songs written by Jack Keller (songwriter)
Jan and Dean songs
Songs with lyrics by Gerry Goffin
1963 singles
Little Eva songs